Yahoo! Research Berkeley is a research partnership between Yahoo! Inc. and the University of California, Berkeley to research and develop social media and mobile media technology and applications that are intended to help people to create, share, and modify media on the Internet. Yahoo! Research Labs - Berkeley is meant to combine the resources of Yahoo! with the researchers of the university. This creates a corporate-academic collaboration for research and development.

Notes

External links
 UC Berkeley

University of California, Berkeley
Research Berkeley
Science and technology in the San Francisco Bay Area